Ardell William Diessner (July 28, 1923 – March 27, 2021) was an American politician and medical doctor in the state of Minnesota. He was born in Minneapolis, Minnesota and was raised in Waconia, Minnesota. Diessner graduated from Waconia High School in 1941. Diessner lived in Redwood Falls, Minnesota. He moved to Afton, Minnesota in 1970. He served in the Minnesota State Senate from 1983 to 1990 as a member of the Democratic–Farmer–Labor Party, representing district 56. Diessner was a medical doctor, having graduated from the University of Minnesota. Diessner served in the United States Army from 1951 to 1952 in Fort Riley, Kansas, and Korea and was commissioned a captain. Diessner moved to Bella Vista, Arkansas in 2003. He died at his home in Mora, Minnesota.

References

1923 births
2021 deaths
United States Army officers
Politicians from Minneapolis
People from Mora, Minnesota
People from Waconia, Minnesota
People from Washington County, Minnesota
Military personnel from Minnesota
University of Minnesota Medical School alumni
Physicians from Minnesota
Democratic Party Minnesota state senators
American expatriates in South Korea